Graball, Tennessee may refer to the following places in Tennessee:
Graball, Gibson County, Tennessee, an unincorporated community
Graball, Marshall County, Tennessee, an unincorporated community
Graball, Sumner County, Tennessee, a census-designated place